Gais railway station is a railway station in the municipality of Gais, in the Swiss canton of Appenzell Ausserrhoden. It is located at the junction of the  Appenzell–St. Gallen–Trogen and Altstätten–Gais lines of Appenzell Railways.

Services 
 the following services stop at Gais:

 St. Gallen S-Bahn:
 : half-hourly service between Appenzell and Trogen.
 : hourly service to Altstätten Stadt.

Scheduled transfers between the S21 and S24 enable hourly service from Altstätten Stadt to Appenzell and St. Gallen and vice versa.

References

External links 
 
 

Railway stations in the canton of Appenzell Ausserrhoden
Appenzell Railways stations